Joseph Dweba (born 25 October 1995) is a South African professional rugby union player for  in the United Rugby Championship competition. His regular position is hooker.

Club career

Golden Lions / South African Schools

His first provincial representation came in 2011, when he was selected for the  Under-16 side that played at the Grant Khomo Week competition.

He also represented the  two years later, this time in the premier South African high school rugby union competition, the Under-18 Craven Week, held in Polokwane. He appeared in all three of their matches, including the 29–45 defeat in the unofficial final against . His performance led to his inclusion in the South African Schools side and he made appearances for them in wins against England, France and Wales in August 2013.

Free State Cheetahs / South Africa Under-20

He remained in the thoughts of the national selectors and was called up into the South Africa Under-20 squad for the 2014 IRB Junior World Championship held in New Zealand in June 2014. He came on as a replacement in their second Pool C match against hosts New Zealand, helping them to a 33–24 victory. He was an unused replacement for final pool match against Samoa and in their 32–25 semi-final win against New Zealand. He played off the bench in the final against England, coming on just after half time, but could not prevent South Africa losing the match 20–21 to finish as runners-up in the competition. He returned to domestic action in the latter half of 2014, making two appearances for the  side in the 2014 Under-19 Provincial Championship.

After playing a single match for club side Bloemfontein Crusaders in the 2015 SARU Community Cup, Dweba was included in the  that competed in the 2015 Vodacom Cup. He made his provincial first class debut by starting their opening match of the season against , but ended on the losing side as SWD ran out 17–33 winners.

He was included in a 37-man training squad for the South African Under-20 team and started a friendly match against a Varsity Cup Dream Team in April 2015. He was included in the squad that toured Argentina in May 2015; he started their first match, a 25–22 win for South Africa, and came on as a replacement in their second match, scoring a try five minutes from time in a 39–28 victory.

Upon the team's return, he was named in the final squad for the 2015 World Rugby Under 20 Championship. He was an unused replacement in their first match of the competition, a 33–5 win against hosts Italy, but started their remaining two matches in Pool B; a 40–8 win against Samoa and a 46–13 win over Australia to help South Africa finish top of Pool B to qualify for the semi-finals with the best record pool stage of all the teams in the competition. Dweba started their semi-final match against England, but could not prevent them losing 20–28 to be eliminated from the competition by England for the second year in succession and played off the bench in their third-place play-off match against France, helping South Africa to a 31–18 win to secure third place in the competition.

Union Bordeaux Bègles
In 2020 he joined Bordeaux, in the Top 14 competition from the 2020-21 season.

International career 
In June 2021, Dweba was called up by the national team for the first time being included in a 46-man Springbok Squad to do duty against the British and Irish Lions. He made his test debut for Springboks against  on 14 August 2021 at the Nelson Mandela Bay Stadium.

References

External links
 

1995 births
Living people
Cheetahs (rugby union) players
Free State Cheetahs players
Rugby union hookers
Rugby union players from Carletonville
South Africa international rugby union players
South Africa Under-20 international rugby union players
South African rugby union players
Union Bordeaux Bègles players
Stormers players
Western Province (rugby union) players